William James Nicks (August 2, 1905 – November 2, 1999) was an American football player and coach. He coached at historically black colleges in the Southern United States from 1930 to 1965. Nicks served as the head football coach at Morris Brown College in Georgia (1930–1935, 1937–1939, 1941–1942) and at Prairie View A&M University in Texas (1945–1947, 1952–1965), compiling a career college football record of 192–60–21. He was the NAIA Football Coach of the Year in 1963 and his teams were declared the black college football national champions six times. Nicks was inducted into the College Football Hall of Fame as a coach in 1999.

Coaching career

Morris Brown
Nicks took first collegiate head coaching position at his alma mater, Morris Brown College in Atlanta, Georgia. Nicks was head football coach at Morris Brown from 1930 to 1935, again from 1937 to 1939, and for two more years in 1941 and 1942. His record at Morris Brown was 65–21–13. His 1941 team was named "Black College National Champions" by Pittsburgh Courier.

Prairie View A&M
Nicks was the eighth head coach at Prairie View A&M University in Prairie View, Texas, serving 17 seasons in two stints, from 1945 to 1947 and 1952 to 1965. His career record at Prairie View was 126–36–8—far and away the winningest coach in school history.

Nicks led the Panthers to five black college national titles and six Southwestern Athletic Conference titles. In his day, he was reckoned as the HBCU answer to Bear Bryant; indeed, his .787 winning percentage was slightly higher than Bryant's .780. This was partly because he had the pick of nearly every good black high school player in Texas in the days of segregation. His teams were among the few who held their own against Eddie Robinson's powerhouses at Grambling; Robinson later said that he dreaded playing Prairie View. While the end of Jim Crow caused a severe talent drain for HBCUs, Nicks was able to stem the tide for a time. He did so by relying on his former players who had gone into coaching; at one point nearly all of the black high school coaches in Texas had played for him. He often called his former players to send their best prospects to "The Hill," and wasn't above threatening to have them fired if they didn't do so. However, Prairie View's fortunes tailed off rapidly after Nicks' retirement. From 1966 to 2003, Prairie View had 14 head coaches, none of whom left "The Hill" with a winning record. This period included an NCAA-record 80-game losing streak from 1989 to 1998.

Nicks was inducted into the College Football Hall of Fame in 1999. Nicks is buried at the Houston Memorial Gardens Cemetery in Pearland, Texas.

Head coaching record

References

External links
 
 

1905 births
1999 deaths
American football ends
American football halfbacks
American football punters
American men's basketball players
Morris Brown Wolverines baseball players
Morris Brown Wolverines football coaches
Morris Brown Wolverines football players
Morris Brown Wolverines men's basketball players
Prairie View A&M Panthers and Lady Panthers athletic directors
Prairie View A&M Panthers football coaches
College Football Hall of Fame inductees
College men's track and field athletes in the United States
People from Griffin, Georgia
Coaches of American football from Georgia (U.S. state)
Players of American football from Georgia (U.S. state)
African-American coaches of American football
African-American players of American football
African-American college athletic directors in the United States
20th-century African-American sportspeople